Tiffany Jones was a British comic strip that ran in syndication between 1964 and 1977 and was published in Daily Sketch. The series centred on a young woman who travelled to London to become a fashion model. It is notable for being created by two female comic strip artists, Pat Tourret and Jenny Butterworth. The strip portrayed feminist themes and included some erotic fanservice.

The series was popular enough to inspire a 1973 comedy film, Tiffany Jones.

Tiffany Jones was listed in 1001 Comics You Should Read Before You Die by Quintessence Editions.

Sources

1964 comics debuts
1977 comics endings
British comic strips
British comics adapted into films
Comics about women
Drama comics
Jones, Tiffany
Jones, Tiffany
Jones, Tiffany
Jones, Tiffany